Vasheh (also Romanized as Vāsheh; also known as Vashā and Wāsha) is a village in Qarah Kahriz Rural District, Qarah Kahriz District, Shazand County, Markazi Province, Iran. At the 2006 census, its population was 1,000, in 252 families.

Vashe is a village in Markazi province and one of the functions of Shazand city, which is located between Arak and Shazand cities. The village has a population of more than a thousand people; The main occupation of its people is agriculture. The agricultural products of this village include wheat, barley, grapes, almonds and walnuts.

Geographically, the three sides of this village are surrounded by mountains and its highest mountain is located in the south of the village.

The neighbors of this village are Bazneh from the south, Bagh Bar Aftab from the west and Sirkand from the north.

Vasheh became one of the villages of Shahbaz new city in 2012.

Vashe has a population of 1,500 and 252 families. The height of the village is 2168 meters above sea level

References 

Populated places in Shazand County